Sona Nair (born 4 March 1975) is an Indian actress working mainly in Malayalam cinema who is also best known for her roles in television soaps.

Personal life

Sona Nair attended Al-Uthuman Higher Secondary School, Kazhakoottam, Trivandrum, where her mother was a teacher. She received a degree from Government College for Women, Thiruvananthapuram.

She married Malayalam cinema cameraman Udayan Ambadi in 1996.

Career
Sona Nair got her first credited role in the 1996 film Thooval Kottaram. She then appeared in Katha Nayagan, Veendum Chila Veettukaryangal, Manassinakkare, Passenger and more.

Awards and nominations

In 2004, Sona received the Best Actress Award in the "Kaveri Film Critics Television Awards" for her role in the telefilm Rachiyamma, telecast on Doordarshan. She was named the Best Female Actor at the television category of Sathyan Memorial Awards, 2008. In 2006, she won the Best Supporting Actress award in both Kerala State TV Awards and telefilm category of Sathyan Memorial Awards, for her role in Amrita TV's Samasya.

Filmography

Films

Television

Web series

References

External links
 
 Sona Nair at MSI

Actresses from Thiruvananthapuram
Actresses in Malayalam cinema
Indian film actresses
Living people
21st-century Indian actresses
20th-century Indian actresses
Indian soap opera actresses
1975 births
Actresses in Tamil cinema
Indian television actresses
Actresses in Malayalam television
Actresses in Tamil television
Actresses in Hindi cinema
Actresses in Telugu cinema